Minsheng Road is a station on Line 6 of the Shanghai Metro. It began services on 29 December 2007. It later became an interchange station after the opening of Line 18 on 30 December 2021.

Station Layout

References 

Railway stations in Shanghai
Shanghai Metro stations in Pudong
Railway stations in China opened in 2007
Line 6, Shanghai Metro
Line 18, Shanghai Metro